The Agrarian Labor Party (PAL) was a Chilean political party supporting the candidacy of Carlos Ibáñez del Campo for the 1952 presidential election. Formed in 1945, it was dissolved in 1958.

It was formed in 1945 from the merger of the Agrarian Party, the Popular Freedom Alliance (an offshoot of the National Socialist Movement of Chile), the Movimiento Nacionalista de Chile and the Unión Nacionalista. Its foundational program, emphasising law and order, asserted the need to "secure public order in the country, on the functional basis that labour has not only obligations but also indisputable civil rights."

In 1951 the PAL proclaimed as its presidential candidate the former dictator Carlos Ibáñez del Campo, who had, since his first term, somehow changed political orientation. After his election in 1952, it took part in his first cabinet, along with the Popular Socialist Party formed of dissidents of the Socialist Party. Starting in 1954, the PAL's influence on Ibáñez's cabinet declined, leading to an internal crisis and to the subsequent use of the PAL label by two different organizations.

Legally, the ownership of the PAL label was among the faction opposing Ibáñez, led by the senator Julio von Mühlenbrock. New divisions split the PAL for the 1958 presidential election, with the official faction supporting the candidate of the Christian Democrat Party, Eduardo Frei Montalva, while activists from Cautín and Biobío and dissidents who formed the Partido Agrario Laborista Recuperacionista (Recover Agrarian Labor Party) supported the right-wing candidate Jorge Alessandri, along with the United Conservative Party and the Liberal Party. The PAL subsequently dissolved itself in October 1958, merging with the National Party to create the PANAPO (Partido Nacional Popular, National People's Party).

The PANAPO itself was dissolved in 1961, a faction joining the Christian Democrats, while another merged with the PADENA (Partido Democrático Nacional, National Democratic Party) which joined the left-wing FRAP coalition. Finally, a third tendency attempted to maintain the original party, without any success.

A group tried to revive the PAL for the 1965 parliamentary election under the label of Partido Democracia Agrario Laborista, but did not manage in obtaining any political representation.

Electoral results 
1949 (147 deputies in total) 	14 deputies elected	38.742 voices 	       8,3% of the votes 
1953 (147 deputies in total) 	26 deputies elected	118.483 voices 	 	15,2% of the votes 
1957 (147 deputies in total) 	10 deputies elected	68.602 voices 	 	7,8% of the votes 
1965 (147 deputies in total) 	0 deputies elected	23.634 voices 	 	1.0% of the votes

Presidential candidates 
The following is a list of the presidential candidates supported by the Agrarian Labor Party. (Information gathered from the Archive of Chilean Elections). 
1946: Fernando Alessandri (lost)
1952: Carlos Ibáñez (won)
1958: Eduardo Frei Montalva (lost)

References

See also 
Chilean Agrarian Party
Presidential Republic Era

1945 establishments in Chile
1958 disestablishments in Chile
Defunct agrarian political parties
Defunct political parties in Chile
Far-right political parties in Chile
Labour parties
Political parties disestablished in 1958
Political parties established in 1945
Presidential Republic (1925–1973)
Right-wing parties in South America
Right-wing politics in Chile
Third Position